Bambasari (also Romanized as Bambāsarī; also known as Bambāsar) is a village in Negur Rural District, Dashtiari District, Chabahar County, Sistan and Baluchestan Province, Iran. At the 2006 census, its population was 593, in 112 families.

References 

Populated places in Chabahar County